The Good, The Bad And The Cuddly is the debut album by Canadian pop band The Bicycles.  Randy Lee left the band following the release to join The Hylozoists.

Despite playing together as a band for nearly five years, the band's debut wasn't released until spring 2006.  The album was partially produced by Dan Bryk and partially by The Bicycles themselves.  The album was mixed by José Miguel Contreras of By Divine Right.

"Cuddly Toy" is a cover of a Harry Nilsson-penned song originally recorded by The Monkees.  "The Defeat" was inspired a song entitled "The Victory" by The Meligrove Band.

Music videos were shot for "Paris Be Mine", "Gotta Get Out", and "Homework".

Track listing
All songs written by Matt Beckett, except where noted.
 "B-B-Bicycles" – 2:07
Lead vocals: Matt Beckett & Drew Smith
 "Australia" – 3:02
Lead vocals: Beckett
 "I Will Appear for You" – 3:10
Lead vocals: Beckett & Smith
 "Gotta Get Out" (Smith) – 2:01
Lead vocals: Smith
 "I Know We Have to Be Apart" (Smith) – 2:42
Lead vocals: Dana Snell
 "Ghost Town" (Smith) – 3:52
Lead vocals: Smith
 "Longjohns and Toques" – 1:47
Lead vocals: Beckett
 "The Defeat" (Beckett, Smith, Snell, Andrew Scott, Randy Lee) – 1:25
 "Luck of Love" – 2:07
Lead vocals: Scott
 "Paris Be Mine" – 1:49
Lead vocals: Beckett
 "Cuddly Toy" (Harry Nilsson) – 2:45
Lead vocals: Beckett
 "Randy's Song" (Smith) – 1:32
Lead vocals: Lee
 "Please Don't Go" – 2:09
Lead vocals: Beckett
 "Sure Was Great" (Smith, Scott) – 1:35
Lead vocals: Smith
 "Homework" – 3:36
Lead vocals: Beckett
 "Pomp and Circumstance" (Beckett, Smith, Snell, Scott, Lee) – 0:08
 "Two Girls from Montreal" (Beckett, Smith) – 2:58
Lead vocals: Beckett

Personnel
The Bicycles are:
Matt Beckett
Drew Smith
Dana Snell
Randy Lee
Andrew Scott

References

2006 albums
The Bicycles albums